VA-16 was a short-lived Attack Squadron of the U.S. Navy, established at NAS Oceana on 1 June 1955. Its motto was Per Aspera Ad Metam (Through Adversities to the Target). The squadron was disestablished on 1 March 1958.

Operational history

The squadron flew AD-6 Skyraiders, and its mission was all-weather attack, including special (nuclear) weapons delivery. In April 1957, while deployed to the Mediterranean aboard , it operated off the coast of Lebanon during the Jordanian crisis. On 18 December 1957, VA-16 conducted the first air-to-air refueling by an operational AD Skyraider squadron using the buddy store. The refueling took place over NAS Oceana and the squadron’s AD-6 refueled an F9F-8.

See also

 Attack aircraft
 History of the United States Navy
 List of inactive United States Navy aircraft squadrons

References

Attack squadrons of the United States Navy
Wikipedia articles incorporating text from the Dictionary of American Naval Aviation Squadrons